Urodopsis is a genus of moths of the family Zygaenidae.

Species
 Urodopsis subcaeruleus (Dognin, 1910)
 Urodopsis pusilla (Walker, 1854)
 Urodopsis dryas Jordan, 1915

References
 Urodopsis at funet.fi

Procridinae
Zygaenidae genera